The Kotka Port railway station is located in the town of Kotka, Finland, right by its namesake, the Kotka ferry terminal.

Despite such naming, Kotka Port is somewhat nearer to the actual center of Kotka, also being the initial reason for the station's inception. Furthermore, its location makes it possible for passengers to transfer to and from Baltic Sea ferries.

Kotka Port is the origin of VR commuter rail line  and the southern terminus of the Kotka Line from Kouvola.

History 
A railway stop called Satamakatu – in use from 1932 to 1938 and situated about  further east  – can be considered an early predecessor of the modern Kotka Port station. A footpath leading across the tracks is the only remaining feature of the former halt.

The current station originated as an summertime experiment in the early 1990s to take passengers closer to the centre of events during the annual Kotka Maritime Festival. It became a permanent full-time station in 1998 and has since functioned as the southern terminus of regional trains to and from Kouvola and Lahti . In 2022, regional trains serving the Kotka Line were integrated into VR commuter rail, receiving the line designation .

The official English name of the station used to be Kotka Harbour.

Future plans 

In a 2020 study by the Finnish Transport Infrastructure Agency regarding the future of the Kotka Line and the Hamina Line, it was stated that the possibility of service increases might justify the addition of another platform track at the station.

Services 
 Stopping train to Kouvola / on certain departures to Lahti

External links 
 
 Departures and arrivals at Kotka Port station on Junat.net

References 

Kotka
Railway stations in Kymenlaakso
Railway stations opened in 1998